The 2021–22 Croatian Women's Football Cup was the 31st season of the annual Croatian football cup competition. Twenty six teams participated in the competition, all eight teams from the 2021–22 Croatian Women's First Football League and all teams from second level. The competition started on 19 September 2021 and ended on 5 June 2022 with the final in Županja, a nominally neutral venue.

Matches

Preliminary round

Round of 16

Quarter-finals

Semi-finals

Final

References

External links
Competition rules 

2021 in Croatian women's sport
2022 in Croatian women's sport
Women's football in Croatia
Football competitions in Croatia